João Carlos Pedro Leopoldo Borromeo, Prince of Beira; (6 March 1821, in Rio de Janeiro, Brazil – 4 February 1822, in Rio de Janeiro, Brazil) was a Portuguese infante (prince), son of heir-apparent to the throne Pedro, Prince Royal (future Emperor Pedro I of Brazil) and Maria Leopoldina of Austria.

Ancestry

References

House of Braganza
1821 births
1822 deaths
Princes of Beira
19th-century Portuguese people
Sons of emperors
Sons of kings
Royalty and nobility who died as children